Rachel Sherman (born June 7, 1970) is an associate professor of sociology at the New School for Social Research. Her first book, Class Acts: Service and Inequality in Luxury Hotels (University of California Press, 2007), analyzes how workers, guests, and managers in luxury hotels make sense of and negotiate class inequalities that marked their relationships. Her second book, Uneasy Street: The Anxieties of Affluence (Princeton University Press, 2017), explores the lived experience of privilege among wealthy and affluent parents in New York City.

Education
Sherman obtained her bachelor's degree in Development Studies from Brown University. She received a master's degree and Ph.D. in sociology from the University of California, Berkeley.

Career
Prior to serving at The New School for Social Research, Sherman was an assistant professor in the Sociology Department of Yale University.

Research
Sherman studies "how and why unequal social relations are reproduced, legitimated, and contested, and in how these processes are embedded in cultural vocabularies of identity, interaction, and entitlement. Her research interests include: social class, culture, service work, social movements, and qualitative methods. 

Sherman's first book, Class Acts: Service and Inequality in Luxury Hotels, analyzes the production and consumption of luxury service work. Drawing on participant observation, Sherman "goes behind the scenes in two urban luxury hotels to give a nuanced picture of the workers who care for and cater to wealthy guests by providing seemingly unlimited personal attention." She finds that the interactions between service workers and wealthy guests normalize inequality.

In Uneasy Street: the Anxieties of Affluence, Sherman shifts her perspective to wealthy and affluent parents in New York City. Over the course of fifty in-depth interviews, "including hedge fund financiers and corporate lawyers, professors and artists, and stay-at-home mothers," Sherman investigates aspirations and lifestyle choices, revealing a nuanced picture of their self-description in an increasingly unequal society.

In addition to her extensive scholarship, Sherman teaches at The New School for Social Research and Eugene Lang College.

Memberships and awards
Sherman is a member of the American Sociological Association (ASA). She serves on the editorial board of Oxford University Press book series on Global Ethnography,  a program which publishes research monographs and books aimed at sociologists, social scientists and policy-makers on wide-ranging sociological questions or social policy issues. She is also the editor of the newsletter of the ASA Section on Labor and Labor Movements.

Sherman's article, "Breaking the Iron Law of Oligarchy: Tactical Innovation and the Revitalization of the American Labor Movement" (co-authored with Kim Voss) won the Distinguished Article Award of the Labor Studies Division of the Society for the Study of Social Problems in 2001.

Sherman is a reviewer for a number of professional and scholarly journals, including the American Journal of Sociology, Ethnography, Labor Studies Journal, Social Problems and Theory and Society.

Published works

Books
Uneasy Street: The Anxieties of Affluence. Princeton, NJ: Princeton University Press, 2017 
Class Acts: Service and Inequality in Luxury Hotels. Berkeley, Calif.: University of California Press, 2007.

Recent articles and book chapters
“Conflicted Cultivation: Parenting, Privilege, and Moral Worth in Wealthy New York Families.” American Journal of Cultural Sociology  5(1–2): 1-33.
“Caring or Catering? Emotions, Autonomy and Subordination in Lifestyle Work.” In Caring on the Clock: The Complexities and Contradictions of Paid Care Work, edited by Mignon Duffy, Amy Armenia, and Clare Stacey, Rutgers University Press.
 “The Art of Conversation: The Museum and the Public Sphere in Tino Sehgal’s This Progress.” Public Culture 26(3): 393-418.
 “The Production of Distinctions: Class, Gender and Taste Work in the Lifestyle Management Industry." Qualitative Sociology 34(1): 201-219.
 “Beyond Interaction: Customer Influence on Housekeeping and Room Service Work in Hotels.” Work, Employment and Society 25(1): 19-33.

Co-authored articles
Voss, Kim and Sherman, Rachel. "Breaking the Iron Law of Oligarchy: Tactical Innovation and the Revitalization of the American Labor Movement." American Journal of Sociology. 106:2 (September 2000).

Co-authored book chapters
Carter, Bob; Fairbrother, Peter; Sherman, Rachel; and Voss, Kim. "Made in the USA, Imported into Britain: The Organizing Model and the Limits of Transferability." In Research in the Sociology of Work.  Vol. 11: Labor Revitalization: Global Perspectives and New Initiatives. Dan Cornfield and Holly McCammon, eds. Kidlington, Oxford, U.K.: JAI Press, 2003. 
Sherman, Rachel and Voss, Kim. "Organize or Die: New Organizing Tactics and Immigrant Workers." In Organizing Immigrants: The Challenge for Unions in Contemporary California. Ruth Milkman, ed. Ithaca, N.Y.: Cornell University Press, 2000. 
Voss, Kim and Sherman, Rachel. "You Can't Just Do it Automatically: The Transition to Social Movement Unionism in the United States." In Trade Unions in Renewal: A Comparative Study. Peter Fairbrother and Charlotte A.B. Yates, eds. London: Continuum, 2003.

References

External links
Rachel Sherman, New School

Scientists from New Haven, Connecticut
Brown University alumni
UC Berkeley College of Letters and Science alumni
Yale University faculty
21st-century American historians
Labor historians
1970 births
Living people
American women sociologists
American sociologists
American women historians
21st-century American women writers
Historians from Connecticut